The Conservative A-List or Priority List was a list of United Kingdom candidates drawn up by Conservative Central Office at the behest of David Cameron after his election as party leader in December 2005, aimed as a means of broadening the number of Conservative Members of Parliament, potential peers and MEPs from minority groups and women as well as other preferred candidates for candidature. Where the preferred forums for selection were held, at least two members from the list were put to every open primary, and where these were not held the A-list were recommended directly, particularly to the top target seats.

History
In April 2006, a Conservative Party committee on candidates set out to deliver a promise by David Cameron to transform the Conservative party at Westminster. The committee reduced 500 aspiring politicians on the party's list of approved parliamentary candidates to an "A-list" of between 100 and 150 priority candidates. The result was a list on which more than half of the names were of women. The list included the former Coronation Street actor Adam Rickitt, Zac Goldsmith, the author Louise Bagshawe (later Mensch), and Margot James.

Amid controversy, the "A-list" approach was endorsed by Michael Portillo, a Conservative MP until 2005, who in 2006 said that  Conservative chairmen and activists in seats considered potentially winnable were in the run-up to the 2010 election urged by Conservative Central Office to select candidates from the new A-list and were in many cases included in open primaries, new and preferred open-to-all selection meetings.

The 2010 general election saw failures as well as successes for the "A-listers" selected for 'winnable' seats.

Listed
Those on the A-list included the following: (bold marks people elected to Parliament in 2010) 

Amar Ahmed,  a GP in Cheshire since 2000 and was National Chairman Conservative Policy Forum, Public Sector and Infrastructure, between 2011 and 2015.
Tariq Ahmad, now a member of the House of Lords
Louise Bagshawe (later Mensch), MP for Corby, 2010–2012
Shaun Bailey, children's worker, PPC for Hammersmith 2010, candidate for Mayor of London, 2021
Harriett Baldwin, MP for West Worcestershire, 2010– *
Steve Barclay, MP for North East Cambridgeshire, 2010– *
Gavin Barwell, MP for Croydon Central, 2010–2017 *
James Bethell, a Founder of the Ministry of Sound (subsequently inherited his father's peerage)
Nick Boles, MP for Grantham and Stamford, 2010–2019 *
Karen Bradley, MP for Staffordshire Moorlands, 2010–  
Angie Bray, MP for Ealing Central and Acton, 2010–2015 
Steve Brine, MP for Winchester, 2010– 
Fiona Bruce, MP for Congleton, 2010–  
Dr. David Bull, television presenter, PPC for Brighton Pavilion, 2010, Brexit Party MEP, 2019–2020
Conor Burns, MP for Bournemouth West, 2010– *
Georgina Butler, former Ambassador of the United Kingdom to Costa Rica
Martin Callanan, MEP for North East England
Joanne Cash, barrister, PPC for Westminster North 2010
Pam Chesters London Assembly Advisor for Health and Youth Opportunities
Damian Collins, MP for Folkestone and Hythe, 2010– *
Tim Collins, former MP
Charles Crawford, former Ambassador of the United Kingdom to Poland
Iain Dale, blogger
Caroline Dinenage, MP for Gosport, 2010– 
Jane Ellison, MP for Battersea, 2010–2017 
Wilfred Emmanuel-Jones, Entrepreneur of the Year — the Black Enterprise Awards 2005, PPC Chippenham 2010
Howard Flight, former MP, now member of the House of Lords
Vicky Ford, MEP for East of England, MP for Chelmsford, 2017– *
Jacqueline Foster, MEP for North West England
George Freeman, MP for Mid Norfolk, 2010– *
David Gold, PPC for Eltham 2010
Zac Goldsmith, MP for Richmond Park, 2010–2016, 2017–2019, member of the House of Lords, 2020–
Francois Gordon, former High Commissioner to Uganda
Helen Grant, MP for Maidstone and The Weald, 2010–
Andrew Griffiths, MP for Burton, 2010–2019 *
Sam Gyimah, MP for East Surrey, 2010–2019 *
Rebecca Harris, MP for Castle Point, 2010– *
Chris Heaton-Harris, MP for Daventry, 2010–
Margot James, MP for Stourbridge, 2010–2019
Syed Kamall, MEP for London
Pauline Latham, MP for Mid Derbyshire, 2010– *
Andrea Leadsom, MP for South Northamptonshire, 2010– *
Dr. Phillip Lee, MP for Bracknell, 2010–2019 *
Brandon Lewis, MP for Great Yarmouth, 2010– 
Group Captain Al Lockwood
Jack Lopresti, MP for Filton and Bradley Stoke, 2010–
Kit Malthouse, Member of the London Assembly, MP for North West Hampshire 2015–
Paul Maynard, MP for Blackpool North, 2010–
Anne McIntosh, MP for Thirsk and Malton, 2010–2015
Esther McVey, MP for Wirral West, 2010–2015 and Tatton, 2017–
Mark Menzies, MP for Fylde, 2010– *
Priti Patel, MP for Witham, 2010– *
Mark Pawsey, MP for Rugby, 2010–
Andrew Percy, MP for Brigg and Goole, 2010–
Kulveer Ranger, Director of Environment
Annunziata Rees-Mogg, journalist, PPC for Somerton and Frome, 2010, Brexit Party MEP, 2019–2020
Adam Rickitt, actor and singer
Caroline Righton, presenter, PPC for St Austell and Newquay, 2010
Murad Roberts, Member of the Society of Conservative Lawyers, 2015
Amber Rudd, MP for Hastings and Rye, 2010–2019
Laura Sandys, MP for Thanet South, 2010–2015
Jane Scott, Leader of Wiltshire Council, now member of the House of Lords
Anna Soubry, MP for Broxtowe, 2010–2019
Andrew Stephenson, MP for Pendle, 2010–
Mel Stride, MP for Central Devon, 2010– *
Philippa Stroud,  Director of the Centre for Social Justice, joined House of Lords in 2015
Liz Truss, MP for South West Norfolk, 2010–. Prime Minister of the United Kingdom, 2022.
Sayeeda Warsi, now member of the House of Lords 
Heather Wheeler, MP for South Derbyshire, 2010–
Susan Williams, now member of the House of Lords

Notes and references

Notes

References

History of the Conservative Party (UK)
David Cameron
Organisation of the Conservative Party (UK)